Order of battle for the Campaign of Northern and Eastern Honan 1938 during the Second Sino-Japanese War.

Japan

North China Front Army - Field Marshal Count Hisaichi Terauchi   
 16th Division - Lt. Gen. Keisuke Fujie				
 19th Infantry Brigade				
 9th Infantry Regiment				
 20th Infantry Regiment 				
 30th Infantry Brigade				
 33rd Infantry Regiment				
 38th Infantry Regiment				
 22nd Field Artillery Regiment			
 20th Cavalry Regiment					
 16th Engineer Regiment				
 16th Transport Regiment
 114th Division -Lt. Gen. Shigeji Suematsu
 127th Infantry Brigade
 66th Infantry Regiment
 115th Infantry Regiment
 128th Infantry Brigade
 102nd Infantry Regiment
 150th Infantry Regiment
 120th Field Artillery Regt
 118th Cavalry Regiment
 114th Engineer Regiment
 114th Transport Regiment
 3rd Infantry Brigade / 2nd Division - Major Gen. Kazuo Isa [2]
  4th Infantry Regiment
 29th Infantry Regiment
 13th Infantry Brigade / 7th Division - Major Gen. Tadao Yoshizawa [2]
 25th Infantry Regiment
 26th Infantry Regiment
Imada Detachment- Colonel Imada
 2nd Tank Battalion - Colonel Imada
 36 Type 89 Medium Tanks
 1st Battalion of 9th Infantry Regiment
 One mountain gun company
 One engineer platoon
 and other support units
 1st Army - Kyoji Kotsuki
 14th Division - Kenji Doihara
 27th Infantry Brigade				
 2nd Infantry Regiment
 59th Infantry Regiment				
 28th Infantry Brigade				
 15th Infantry Regiment
 50th Infantry Regiment
 20th Field Artillery Regiment			
 18th Cavalry Regiment				
 14th Engineer Regiment				
 14th Transport Regiment		
 108th Division - Kumaya Shimomoto
 25th Infantry Brigade
 117th Infantry Regiment
 132nd Infantry Regiment
 104th Infantry Brigade
 52nd Infantry Regiment
 105th Infantry Regiment
 108th Field Artillery Regiment
 108th Cavalry Regiment
 108th Engineer Regiment
 108th Transport Regiment
2nd Army - Gen. Nishio
10th Division - Lt. Gen. Yoshio Shinozuka				
 8th Infantry Brigade				
 39th Infantry Regiment				
 40th Infantry Regiment				
 33rd Infantry Brigade[Seya Detachment]				
 10th Infantry Regiment				
 63rd Infantry Regiment				
 10th Field Artillery Regiment			
 10th Cavalry Regiment				
 10th Engineer Regiment				
 10th Transport Regiment

China

China (Feb. 1938)

1st War Area - Cheng Chien 
  Eastern Honan Army -  Hsueh Yueh
 64th Corps  -   Li Han-huen
 155th Division - Chen Kung-hsin
 187th Division - Peng Ling-cheng
 74th Corps - Wang Yao-wu
 51st Division - Wang Yao-wu
 58th Division - Po Hui-chang
 8th Corps - 	Huang Chieh
 40th Division - Lo Li-jung
 102nd Division - Po Hui-chang
27th Corps - Kuei Yung-ching
 36th Division [g] - Chiang Fu-sheng
 46th Division - Li Liang-yung
 17th Army - Hu Tsung-nan
 1st Corps - Li Tieh-chun
 1st Division - Li Tieh-chun
 78th Division - Li Wen
 3rd Army Group - Sun Tung-hsuan
 12th Corps - Sun Tung-hsuan
 20th Division - Chang Tse-ming
 22nd Division - Ku Liang-min
 81st Division - Chan Shu-tang
 55th Corps - Tsao Fu-lin
 29th Division - Tsao Fu-lin
 74th Division - Li Han-chang
 20th Army - Shang Chen
 32nd Corps - Shang Chen
 139th Division - Li Chao-ying
 141st Division - Sung Ken-tang
 142nd Division - Lu Chi
 Salt Gabelle Brigade - Chian Chi-ke
 23rd Division - Li Pi-fan
 71st Corps - Sung Hsi-lien
 87th Division [g] - Shen Fa-tsao
 88th Division [g] - Fung Mu-han
 39th Corps -  Liu Ho-ting
 34th Division - Kung Ping-fan
 56th Division - Liu Shang-chih
 1st Army Group - Sung Che-yuan
 77th Corps - Feng Chih-an
 37th Division - Chang Ling-yun
 132nd Division - Wang Chang-hai
 179th  Division - Ho Chi-feng
 69th Corps - Shih Yu-san
 181st Division - Shih Yu-san
  New 9th  Division - Kao Shu-hsun
 53rd Corps - Wan Fu-lin
 116th  Division - Chao Fu-cheng
 130th  Division - Chu Hung-hsun
91st Corps - Kao Tse-chu
 166th Division - Ma Li-wu
 45th Division - Liu Chin
90th Corps - Peng Chin-chih
 195th Division - Liang Kai
 196th Division - Liu Chao-huan
 New 8th Division - Chiang Tsai-chen
 95th Division - Lo Chi
 91st Division - Feng Chan-tsai
 New 35th Division - Wang Ching-tsai
 61st  Division - Chung Sung
 106th  Division - Shen Ke
 109th  Division - Li Shu-sen
 94th  Division - Chu Huai-ping
 24th  Division - Lin Ying
 9th Reserve Division - Chang Yen-chuan
 8th  Reserve Division - Ling Chao-yao
 28th Separate Brigade - Wu Hua-wen
 Hopei Militia - Chang Yin-wu
 Hopei Chahar Guerilla Commander - Sun Tien-ying
 3rd Cavalry Corps - Cheng Ta-chang
 4th Cavalry Division - Chang The-shun
 9th Cavalry Division - Wang Chi-feng
 14th Separate Cavalry Brigade - Chang Chan-kuei
 2nd Brigade, New 1st Cavalry Division - Ma Lu
 13th Cavalry Brigade - Yao Ching-chuan
 6th Artillery Brigade - Huang Yung-an
 10th Separate Artillery Brigade - Peng Meng-chi
 5th Regiment, 1st Arty Brigade - Li Kang-yen
 7th Separate Artillery Regiment - Chang Kuang-hou
 9th Separate Artillery Regiment - Kuang Yu-ai

Notes:
[g] Formerly German trained Divisions, badly mauled in the battles of Shanghai and Nanking they were no longer the elite formations they had once been.

Sources: 
[1] Hsu Long-hsuen and Chang Ming-kai, History of The Sino-Japanese War (1937–1945) 2nd Ed., 1971. Translated by Wen Ha-hsiung, Chung Wu Publishing; 33, 140th Lane, Tung-hwa Street, Taipei, Taiwan Republic of China. Pg.230 - 235. Map 9-2.

Honan
Honan